Dennis is an unincorporated community in Labette County, Kansas, United States.  As of the 2020 census, the population of the community and nearby areas was 152.

History
Dennis had its start in the early 1880s by the building of the Memphis, Kansas and Colorado Railroad through that territory.  The first post office in Dennis was established in May 1881.

The nearby Big Hill Archeological District is on the National Register of Historic Places.

Demographics

For statistical purposes, the United States Census Bureau has defined this community as a census-designated place (CDP).

Education
The community is served by Labette County USD 506 public school district.

See also
 Big Hill Lake

References

Further reading

External links
 Labette County maps: Current, Historic, KDOT

Unincorporated communities in Labette County, Kansas
Unincorporated communities in Kansas
1881 establishments in Kansas
Populated places established in 1881